Memory of a Broken Dimension is an upcoming adventure video game developed by XRA.

Gameplay

Memory of a Broken Dimension begins with a command prompt interface called RELICS through which the player must navigate to reach the game world. Once inside the first-person perspective 3D game, the player will find themselves in black and white, distorted and static-filled areas. The player must move around shattered objects until their perspective shows them as a single object, at which point they can lock them in place as that object.

Development
Ezra Hanson-White began development on the game in 2011, spending the first couple of years experimenting and learning and primarily working on the game at night. In 2014 he quit his job and began work on the game full-time. The game originally started with the player as a person in their apartment who would sit down at their computer to start the game, but this was removed in favour of the player themselves feeling like they're discovering something.

Hanson-White considers the mystery and difficulty of playing old, particularly DOS, games as inspiration for Memory of a Broken Dimension and the artistic style is partly inspired by video artifacts when streaming videos on a poor internet connection as well as space exploration and archaeology. He says that while working as a level designer on games made at large companies he grew frustrated at the simple linear areas he was creating, and wanted to experiment with game worlds with no objectives or guidance. Hanson-White continues to stream some of the game's development online.

Reception
In 2015 Memory of a Broken Dimension was a finalist at the Independent Games Festival in the Excellence in the Visual Arts category.

References

External links

Upcoming video games
Adventure games
First-person video games
Hacking video games
Indie video games
Windows games
MacOS games
Linux games
Monochrome video games
Video games about video games
Video games developed in the United States